The 25th meridian of longitude west from Washington is a line of longitude approximately 102.05 degrees west of the Prime Meridian of Greenwich.  In the United States of America, the meridian 25 degrees west of the Washington Meridian defines the eastern boundary of the State of Colorado, the western boundary of the State of Kansas, and the western boundary of the State of Nebraska south of the 41st parallel north.

History
On January 1, 1861, the Act Admitting the State of Kansas to the Union defined the western boundary of the new state as the 25th meridian of longitude west from Washington.  This rendered the western portion of the Territory of Kansas unorganized.  Thirty days later on February 28, 1861, the Act Organizing the Territory of Colorado defined the eastern boundary of the new territory as the 25th meridian of longitude west from Washington.  The creation of the Colorado Territory moved the western boundary of the Territory of Nebraska south of the 41st parallel north east to this meridian.  These boundaries on the 25th meridian of longitude west from Washington remained when Nebraska became a state on March 1, 1867, and Colorado became a state on August 1, 1876.

Longitude in the United States
Latitude and longitude uniquely describe the location of any point on Earth.  Latitude may be simply calculated from astronomical or solar observation, either at land or sea, interrupted only by cloudy skies.  Longitude, on the other hand, requires both astronomical or solar observation and some form of time reference to a longitude reference point.  John Harrison produced the first precise marine chronometer in 1761.

The completion of the first North American telegraph line between Washington, D.C. and Baltimore on May 24, 1844, introduced a technology that could transmit time signals at  a large fraction of the speed of light.   On September 28, 1850, the United States adopted two primary meridians of longitude for officially use:  the Greenwich Meridian (through the old Royal Observatory at Greenwich, England) for all nautical and international use, and the Washington Meridian (through the old United States Naval Observatory in Washington, D.C.) for more accurate astronomical and domestic use.  The completion of the first telegraph line across North America, on October 24, 1861, allowed time signals from the Naval Observatory in Washington, D.C. to be transmitted across the continent.

The United States used the Washington Meridian as the longitude reference for most states and territories created between 1861 and 1868.  The completion of the first permanent transatlantic telegraph cable on July 28, 1866, allowed the United States Naval Observatory at Washington, D.C. to be synchronized with the Royal Observatory at Greenwich.  The need for a separate national meridian for the United States gradually faded, and in 1884, U.S. President Chester A. Arthur called the International Meridian Conference in Washington, D.C. which selected the meridian of the Royal Observatory at Greenwich as the international Prime Meridian.  On August 12, 1912, the United States adopted the Prime Meridian of Greenwich for all uses domestic and international.

References

Borders of Colorado
Borders of Kansas
Borders of Nebraska
Pre-statehood history of Colorado
History of Kansas
Pre-statehood history of Nebraska
Meridians (geography)